Mario Hytten (born 20 April 1955) is a Swedish-born former racing driver who raced predominantly under a Swiss licence. He competed in the 1985 24 Hours of Le Mans, finishing 5th. He now works as a sports promoter and sponsorship specialist. He is fluent in five languages.

Racing career

Hytten raced predominantly in Formula 3 and Formula 3000 in a career spanning more than a decade, from 1980 to 1992. In all he entered 75 races, won one and registered eight podium finishes. He finished 5th in the 1985 24 Hours of Le Mans driving the Porsche 956B.

Post racing
Hytten retired from racing in 1993 and moved into sports media and sponsorship. He is the current CEO of Captimax Sports Media, who make camera systems for televised sporting events, and runs Planetaire AB, a sustainability communications company. He is currently working on Skyrace World Cup, a new format sailplane world championship.

Racing record

Complete 24 Hours of Le Mans results

Complete International Formula 3000 results
(key) (Races in bold indicate pole position; races in italics indicate fastest lap.)

References

External links

Planetaire

1955 births
Living people
Swiss racing drivers
FIA European Formula 3 Championship drivers
International Formula 3000 drivers
IMSA GT Championship drivers
World Sportscar Championship drivers
24 Hours of Le Mans drivers